Deadline (stylized as ..Deadline..) is a 1981 Australian-American made-for-television thriller drama film directed by Arch Nicholson and co-produced by the Australian division of Hanna-Barbera and New South Wales Film Corporation.

Plot 
Journalist Barney Duncan (Barry Newman) discovers that an earthquake on the Australian outback was found to be a small nuclear detonation, and the work of an extortionist who vowed to detonate more devices unless his conditions for blackmail are met.

Cast 
 Barry Newman
 Trisha Noble
 Bruce Spence
 Alwyn Kurts

Production 
It was originally known as Shadow Effects and was shot on location in Sydney, Canberra and the mining town of Broken Hill. It was a pilot for an unmade TV series which was to be called Foreign Correspondent.

At one stage Graham Kennedy was going to play a priest.

Production was held up due to protests from Actors Equity.

"I like the concept, it's a contemporary issue," said Newman during filming in December 1980. "I'm a news nut; my favorite actor is Walter Cronkite."

References

External links 
 

1982 television films
1982 films
Australian television films
Television films as pilots
Television pilots not picked up as a series
Films about nuclear war and weapons
Hanna-Barbera films
Australian thriller films
American thriller television films
1980s English-language films
Films directed by Arch Nicholson
1980s American films
1980s Australian films